T&E may refer to:
 T+E (TV channel) - Canadian cable network
 European Federation for Transport and Environment
 Trial and error
 Travel & entertainment